The 1987 Rutgers Scarlet Knights football team represented Rutgers University in the 1987 NCAA Division I-A football season. In their fourth season under head coach Dick Anderson, the Scarlet Knights compiled a 6–5 record while competing as an independent and were outscored by their opponents 213 to 168. The team's statistical leaders included Scott Erney with 1,369 passing yards, Henry Henderson with 846 rushing yards, and Eric Young with 364 receiving yards.

Schedule

References

Rutgers
Rutgers Scarlet Knights football seasons
Rutgers Scarlet Knights football